Terence Norbert Donovan, Baron Donovan  (13 June 1898 – 12 December 1971) was a British Labour Party politician and later a Lord of Appeal in Ordinary.

Biography 

Born in West Ham, London, Donovan was educated at Brockley Grammar School, before serving in the Bedfordshire Regiment and the Royal Air Force during World War I. After demobilisation, he joined the Civil Service. He was called to the Bar by the Middle Temple in 1924, although he did not begin practising at the bar until 1932.

Donovan was elected as Member of Parliament for Leicester East in the 1945 general election, and took silk the same year. When that constituency was abolished for the 1950 general election, he was re-elected for the new Leicester North East constituency.

However, Donovan resigned from the House of Commons within weeks of the election, when he was appointed as a High Court judge, receiving the customary knighthood (his successor, Sir Lynn Ungoed-Thomas, also became a judge, in 1962). He was promoted to the Court of Appeal in 1960, when he also became a Privy Counsellor. On 11 January 1964 he was appointed as a Lord of Appeal in Ordinary, remaining in post until 1971. As a Law Lord he was given a life peerage as Baron Donovan, of Winchester in the County of Hampshire.

In 1965-68, he chaired the Royal Commission on Trade Unions and Employers' Associations (the so-called "Donovan commission") on the system of collective UK labour law. He died in the City of London aged 73.

Arms

References

External links 
 

1898 births
1971 deaths
Labour Party (UK) MPs for English constituencies
Donovan, Terence Norbert, Baron Donovan
Donovan, Terence Donovan, Baron
UK MPs 1945–1950
UK MPs 1950–1951
UK MPs who were granted peerages
Members of the Judicial Committee of the Privy Council
British trade unions history
Knights Bachelor
English King's Counsel
20th-century King's Counsel
Queen's Bench Division judges
English justices of the peace
20th-century English lawyers